Gianmaria Volpato (born 25 August 2002) known professionally as Gianmaria (stylized as gIANMARIA) is an Italian singer-songwriter and rapper.

Biography 
Volpato was born in Vicenza. He showed an immediate interest in music at the age of 13. During his early musical studies, he alternated his studies by working at a local pizzeria.

In 2021, he took part in the fifteenth edition of the Italian talent show X Factor, under the guidance of mentor Emma Marrone, finishing in second place behind Baltimora. In conjunction with the talent show, he presented his debut single "I suicidi", previously performed during the auditions, written by himself in collaboration with Nicolas "Bais" Biasin.

After the talent show, Gianmaria obtained a recording contract with the label Epic Records, with whom realesed the singles "Tutto o niente 2" and "Mamma scusa". These tracks anticipated the release of the debut EP entitled "Fallirò", which was released on 14 January 2022. The EP debuts at position 25 on the Classifica FIMI Artisti, and is being promoted through the Fallirò Tour 2022.

Gianmaria placed first during the show, with his entry "La città che odi", by rightfully accessing the festival in the  category. "Mostro" was later announced as his entry for the Sanremo Music Festival 2023.

Discography

Extended plays

Singles

As lead artist

As featured artist

Television 

 X Factor (Sky Uno, 2021) Contestant - Runner-up
 Sanremo Giovani 2022 (Rai 1, 2022) Contestant - Winner

Tournées 

 2022 – Fallirò Tour 2022

References 

Italian pop musicians
Italian singer-songwriters
Italian rappers
2002 births
Living people
People from Vicenza